HMS Latona was an  minelayer of the Royal Navy. She served briefly during the Second World War, but was sunk less than six months after commissioning.

Construction and commissioning
Latona was ordered on 23 December 1938 and was laid down at the yards of John I. Thornycroft & Company, of Woolston, Hampshire on 4 April 1939.  She was launched on 20 August 1940 as a fast minelayer.  She was commissioned on 4 May 1941 but never served in her intended primary role, instead being used in the Mediterranean to deliver stores and supplies to the allied armies and garrisons at Tobruk and Cyprus.

Wartime career
On being commissioned Latona sailed to Scapa Flow to embark stores and extra Oerlikon 20 mm cannons for defence against air attacks.  Having completed loading, she sailed for the Mediterranean on 16 May, travelling via the Cape of Good Hope and the Red Sea.  She arrived at Alexandria on 21 June, joining her sister . The following day they sailed to support military operations in the eastern Mediterranean.  Latona’s first assignment was to carry RAF personnel to Cyprus to reinforce the garrison there. After successfully carrying this out, she returned to Alexandria on 25 July.
 
They eventually carried some 6,300 troops to Tobruk and evacuated another 6,100. On 25 October the ships supporting Tobruk came under air attack north of Bardia. Latona, carrying 1,000 Polish troops, was hit in the engine room by a bomb from a Junkers Ju 87 of I./StG1. This started a fire which soon raged out of control. The destroyers  and  came alongside to assist and evacuated most of the troops and crew. Latona remained afloat for a further two hours, before the after magazine exploded, sinking the ship. Four officers, 16 crew members and 7 soldiers were killed.

Notes

References

Bibliography

External links
 Career of HMS Latona
 HMS Latona at Uboat.net

 

Abdiel-class minelayers
Ships built in Southampton
1940 ships
World War II minelayers of the United Kingdom
Ships sunk by German aircraft
Maritime incidents in October 1941
World War II shipwrecks in the Mediterranean Sea
Ships built by John I. Thornycroft & Company
Naval magazine explosions